Pro Moldova is a centre-right political party of the Republic of Moldova. It was founded and is currently led by Andrian Candu, the former President of the Moldovan Parliament.

History

Pro Moldova first appeared on 20 February 2020 as a parliamentary group. This happened due to internal disagreements in the Democratic Party of Moldova (PDM), which caused six deputies to leave the party. These were Andrian Candu, Sergiu Sîrbu, Vladimir Cebotari, Eleonora Graur, Grigore Repeșciuc and Corneliu Padnevici. Candu became the president of the group, while Sîrbu was appointed as the party secretary. Eight days later, on 28 February, the deputy Gheorghe Brașovschi left the PDM and joined to the group.

Months later, more deputies would join the group. The first of them was Ruxanda Glavan, who abandoned the PDM and joined to Pro Moldova on 1 May. She would be followed on 8 May by Elena Bacalu and Oleg Sîrbu, both from the PDM as well, after Candu made an appeal to the opposition to form an antigovernment alliance. Even more deputies from the PDM would join later; Vasile Bîtca and Ghenadie Verdeș did on 18 May, then Angel Agache on 9 June and Eufrosinia Grețu on 17 June.

On 22 June, Pro Moldova was registered as a political party, describing itself as "a modern centre-right party, which fights for a prosperous and fair Moldova for everyone".

In the day of 30 June, the deputy from the Party of Socialists of the Republic of Moldova (PSRM) Ștefan Gațcan joined the party due to the mismanagement of the COVID-19 pandemic in Moldova by the ruling PSRM-PDM coalition. This encountered heavy pressure from the other members of the coalition. In fact, after this, he was harassed by two socialist deputies and filed a complaint for the pressure they tried to exert on him. Following this, Gațcan disappeared, spreading rumors that he had been kidnapped. It was later found that he had withdrawn the complaint, and on 7 July, he was found in Iași, Romania. Finally, on 9 July, he went to a meeting in the Moldovan Parliament and announced that he would continue to support the PSRM-PDM coalition.

Days later, Candu said that he still considered Gațcan a deputy of Pro Moldova, as there continued to be one request from him to join the party but not one to withdraw it. Candu tried to contact Gațcan to clarify the situation to no avail, explaining that this was probably because he was not having an easy time due to the previous incidents.

On 1 September, Candu announced that he would run for the 2020 Moldovan presidential election. He also accused Igor Dodon, who was the President of Moldova at the time, of "having exceeded his powers". However, on 18 September, the Central Election Commission of Moldova rejected Candu's request to be registered for the election for failing to meet the required minimum number of signatures from each district, which was 600. Furthermore, on 3 October, the Supreme Court of Justice of Moldova declared that the appeal filed by Candu regarding this decision was "inadmissible", confirming that he could not participate in the presidential election. Candu said this was a "reconfirmation of loyalty to the regime of Dodon" by the judiciary and that "we believe it was a desperate act by the government for fear of the power of Pro Moldova."

See also
 Politics of Moldova

References

External links
  

2020 establishments in Moldova
Political parties established in 2020
Conservative parties in Moldova
Liberal parties in Moldova
Pro-European political parties in Moldova
Social conservative parties